The Anguished Man is a painting created by an unknown artist. Owner Sean Robinson, from Cumbria, England, claims to have inherited the painting from his grandmother, who told him that the artist who created the painting had mixed his own blood into the paint and died by suicide soon after finishing the work. The painting has been characterized as being supposedly haunted.

Robinson uploaded videos of the painting to his YouTube channel in 2010, in which he claims to have heard crying and moaning noises in his house, and to have once seen "the figure of a man".

In 2016 rights were acquired to make a film based on the story of the painting.

See also
The Crying Boy, a painting that is also said to be cursed
The Hands Resist Him, also known as The eBay Haunted Painting
 Body fluids in art
 List of haunted paintings, works of art believed to be haunted or cursed

References

Curses
Supernatural legends
Painting controversies
Paintings of people
Works of unknown authorship